The Matthias Smock House is a historic house located along River Road in Piscataway, New Jersey. It was added to the National Register of Historic Places on December 4, 1973. It is also a contributing property of the Road Up Raritan Historic District.

See also
List of the oldest buildings in New Jersey

References

External links

National Register of Historic Places in Middlesex County, New Jersey
Houses on the National Register of Historic Places in New Jersey
Piscataway, New Jersey
Colonial architecture in New Jersey
Houses completed in 1720
Houses in Middlesex County, New Jersey
New Jersey Register of Historic Places
Historic American Buildings Survey in New Jersey
1720 establishments in New Jersey